Jehlius cirratus is a species of star barnacle in the family Chthamalidae. This species was formerly in the genus Chthamalus.

References

External links

 

Barnacles